The Beatrix Canal (Dutch: Beatrixkanaal) is an 8.4 km long canal in the southern Netherlands. It was constructed to provide the city of Eindhoven with access to the Wilhelmina Canal.

In order to be able to regulate the level of the Gender and Dommel streams, which regularly threatened to flood Eindhoven's inner city, an additional Discharge Canal (Afwateringskanaal), which is not open to navigation, was dug to connect the Beatrix Canal and the Dommel stream. Into this branch, the Gender now discharges.

Upon completion, the canal was named in honour of the newborn eldest daughter of the heiress apparent to the Dutch throne, Princess Beatrix.

Canals in the Netherlands
Canals in North Brabant
Canals opened in 1940
Transport in Eindhoven
Best, Netherlands